Dejerosa is a genus of spiders in the family Lycosidae. It was first described in 1960 by Roewer. , it contains only one species, Dejerosa picta, found in Mozambique.

References

Endemic fauna of Mozambique
Lycosidae
Monotypic Araneomorphae genera
Spiders of Africa
Taxa named by Carl Friedrich Roewer